Wojciech Lubiński (4 October 1969 in Ryki – 10 April 2010) was a Polish physician and general Polish Armed Force. He was personal physician to Lech Kaczyński.

He died in the 2010 Polish Air Force Tu-154 crash near Smolensk on 10 April 2010. He was posthumously awarded the Order of Polonia Restituta.

References

1969 births
2010 deaths
Polish military doctors
Burials at Powązki Military Cemetery
Officers of the Order of Polonia Restituta
Victims of the Smolensk air disaster
Lech Kaczyński
Polish Army officers